Last Sessions is an album by Canadian jazz guitarist Lenny Breau that was recorded in 1977–78 and released posthumously in 1988. This album represents Breau's final studio recordings for Adelphi Records, not his last studio sessions, which were recorded in 1982 at Audio Media Studios in Nashville, Tennessee (released as When Lightn' Strikes).

History
After signing a three-album deal with Gene Rosenthal for Adelphi Records in 1977, Breau recorded material over period of a few months. Rosenthal and Dan Doyle produced the first sessions recorded during October and November which would become Five O'Clock Bells and Mo' Breau. This posthumous release, recorded during December 1977 and January 1978, was produced by Rosenthal.

Reception

Track listing
"Ebony Queen/Pam's Pad" (McCoy Tyner/Lenny Breau) – 6:50
"Meanwhile Back In L.A." (Breau) – 3:44
"Paris" (Breau) – 8:35
"Ba De Da Da" (Breau) – 2:40
"Feelings" (Morris Albert, arranged by Breau) – 7:12
"I Love You" (Breau) – 4:52
"Untitled Standard" (Breau) – 5:20

CD Bonus Tracks
8. "But Beautiful #2" (Jimmy Van Heusen, Johnny Burke) – 4:40
9. "Beautiful Love" (Wayne King, Victor Young, Egbert Van Alstyne, Haven Gillespie) – 5:14

Personnel
Lenny Breau – guitar

References

External links
lennybreau.com discography entry

Lenny Breau albums
1987 albums
Adelphi Records albums